Reinier Jesus Carvalho (born 19 January 2002), known as Reinier or Reinier Jesus, is a Brazilian professional footballer who plays as an attacking midfielder for La Liga club Girona, on loan from Real Madrid.

Club career

Early career
Born in Brasília, son of former futsal player Mauro Brasília, Reinier joined the youth academy of Vasco da Gama in 2011. He moved to the Botafogo and Fluminense academies before joining Flamengo.

Flamengo
Reinier made his senior team debut for Flamengo on 31 July 2019 in the second leg of Flamengo's Copa Libertadores tie against Emelec at Maracanã Stadium. Flamengo won 2–0 and advanced in the competition on penalty shootouts. He made his league debut against Bahia the following weekend on 4 August.

On 9 November 2019, Reinier extended his contract with Flamengo until 31 October 2024 with a release clause set at €35 million.

Real Madrid
On 20 January 2020, Real Madrid CF announced that the club reached an agreement with Flamengo for the transfer of Reinier, who signed a contract until June 2026. He was assigned to their reserves for the rest of the season. The fee was around €30 million. On 7 March 2020, he scored his first goal for the Castilla against Coruxo.

On 19 August 2020, Real Madrid announced that Reinier would be loaned to Borussia Dortmund until 30 June 2022. On 27 February 2021, he scored his first goal for Borussia Dortmund in a 3–0 home win against Arminia Bielefeld.

In August 2022, he was loaned to Girona on a season-long deal. On 7 September 2022, he scored his first La Liga goal against Real Valladolid.

International career
Reinier was called to the 2017 South American U-15 Championship to represent Brazil. He started against Ecuador and Venezuela, scoring in both matches.

On 7 March 2018, Brazil U17 manager Paulo Victor Gomes called up Reinier for the Montaigu Tournament in France. He captained Brazil for the 2019 South American U-17 Championship in Peru and started all four group stage matches, scoring three goals.

On 2 July 2021, Reinier was named in the Brazil squad for the 2020 Summer Olympics.

Career statistics

Club

Honours

Club
Flamengo
Campeonato Brasileiro Série A: 2019
Copa Libertadores: 2019
FIFA Club World Cup runner-up: 2019

Borussia Dortmund
DFB-Pokal: 2020–21

International
Brazil U23
Summer Olympics: 2020

References

External links

2002 births
Living people
Footballers from Brasília
Brazilian footballers
Brazil youth international footballers
Association football midfielders
CR Flamengo footballers
Real Madrid CF players
Real Madrid Castilla footballers
Borussia Dortmund players
Girona FC players
Campeonato Brasileiro Série A players
Segunda División B players
Bundesliga players
Copa Libertadores-winning players
Brazilian expatriate footballers
Brazilian expatriate sportspeople in Spain
Brazilian expatriate sportspeople in Germany
Expatriate footballers in Spain
Expatriate footballers in Germany
Olympic footballers of Brazil
Footballers at the 2020 Summer Olympics
Olympic medalists in football
Olympic gold medalists for Brazil
Medalists at the 2020 Summer Olympics